Peter S. Wells (born October 9, 1948) is an American anthropologist and author who is Professor of Anthropology at the University of Minnesota.

Biography
Peter S. Wells was born in Boston, Massachusetts on October 9, 1948. Wells received his B.A. from Harvard College in 1970, and his Ph.D. from Harvard University in 1976.

Wells is currently Professor of Anthropology at the University of Minnesota, where he teaches courses on archaeology. He has led a number of important archaeological excavations in Germany. Wells is the author of a number of books on the prehistory of Europe. His book The Barbarians Speak: How the Conquered Peoples Shaped Roman Europe (1999), was awarded the Outstanding Title of 1999 by the Professional and Scholarly Division of the Association of American Publishers. He is an associate editor of the Journal of Indo-European Studies.

Selected works
 Settlement, Economy, and Cultural Change at the End of the European Iron Age: Excavations at Kelheim in Bavaria, 1993
 The Barbarians Speak: How the Conquered Peoples Shaped Roman Europe, 1999
 Beyond Celts, Germans and Scythians: Archaeology and Identity in Iron Age Europe, 2001
 The Battle that Stopped Rome: Emperor Augustus, Arminius, and the Slaughter of the Legions in the Teutoburg Forest, 2003
 Barbarians to Angels: The Dark Ages Reconsidered, 2008
 Image and Response in Early Europe, 2008
 How Ancient Europeans Saw the World: Vision, Patterns, and the Shaping of the Mind in Prehistoric Times, 2012

References

Sources

 
 

1948 births
American anthropologists
American archaeologists
American historians
Harvard College alumni
Harvard University alumni
Living people
People from Boston
University of Minnesota faculty